Mytäjäinen may mean

Mytäjäinen (Lahti), area in Lahti, Finland
Mytäjäinen (pond), a pond in Lahti, Finland